Crash Course in Romance is a 2023 South Korean television series directed by Yoo Je-won, and starring Jeon Do-yeon and Jung Kyung-ho. It aired from January 14 to March 5, 2023 on tvN's Saturdays and Sundays at 21:10 (KST) time slot. It is also available for streaming on Netflix in selected regions.

The series was a commercial hit and became one of the highest-rated dramas in Korean cable television history.

Synopsis
The series follows the bittersweet relationship between a banchan shop owner whose daughter enters the war of Korea's college entrance exams, and a top hagwon instructor.

Cast

Main
 Jeon Do-yeon as Nam Haeng-seon
 Lee Yeon as young Nam Haeng-seon
 A former national handball player who now runs a banchan shop. After her mother's death, she gave up her sports career to take care of her young niece and disabled younger brother.
 Jung Kyung-ho as Choi Chi-yeol
 Kim Min-chul as young Choi Chi-yeol
 A celebrity math instructor at The Pride Academy, a popular private education institute, who has an eating disorder and regularly visits Haeng-seon's shop.

Supporting

People around Haeng-seon
 Roh Yoon-seo as Nam Hae-yi
 Haeng-seon's adopted daughter and niece who was abandoned by her mother—Haeng-seon's sister when she was a child, and was raised by Haeng-seon thereafter. She is the class president of class 2-1 of Woorim High School.
 Oh Eui-shik as Nam Jae-woo
 Haeng-seon's younger brother who has Asperger syndrome.
 Lee Bong-ryun as Kim Young-joo
 Haeng-seon's friend who works at her shop.
 Kim Mi-kyung as Jung Young-soon
 Haeng-seon's mother.

People around Chi-yeol
 Shin Jae-ha as Ji Dong-hee / Jeong Seong-hyeon
 Chi-yeol's manager.
 Kim Da-huin as Jeon Jong-ryeol
 Chi-yeol's friend who is a teacher at Woorim High School.

People in the apartment
 Jang Young-nam as Jang Seo-jin
 Seon-jae's mother who is an attorney.
 Lee Chae-min as Lee Seon-jae
 A student at class 2-1, Hae-yi's best friend who has crush on her.
 Kim Tae-jeong as Lee Hee-jae
 Seon-jae's older brother who gave up higher studies and stays at home.
 Kim Sun-young as Jo Su-hee
 Su-ah's mother who is obsessed with her studies.
 Kang Na-eon as Bang Su-ah
 A student at class 2-1 who has rivalry with Hae-yi.
 Hwang Bo-ra as Lee Mi-ok
 Dan-ji's mother.
 Ryu Da-in as Jang Dan-ji
 A student at class 2-1, close friend of Hae-yi and Seon-jae.
 Lee Min-jae as Seo Geon-hu
 A student in class 2-1 who is an ice hockey athlete. Later, he was diagnosed with a serious shoulder injury and had to stop playing.

People in the hagwon
 Heo Jeong-do as Kang Joon-sang
 The director of The Pride Academy.
 Ji Il-joo as Jin Yi-sang
 An instructor at The Pride Academy.

Extended
 Yoo Jun as Lee Young-min
 A student in the intensive class at The Pride Academy who fell from the roof and died.
 Choi Hee-jin as Young-min's mother
 Lee Do-hye as Jeong Su-hyeon
 Chi-yeol's student who committed suicide.
 Jung Han-seol as Detective Bae
 A detective who handled the case of Young-min's death.
Kim Joon-won as Lee Seung-won
 Seon-jae and Hee-jae's father.

Special appearances
 Yoon Seok-hyun as Song Jun-ho
 Bae Yoon-kyung as Hong Hye-yeon
 Lee Sang-yi as Youtuber "Mr. Popular"
 Bae Hae-sun as Nam Haeng-ja, Hae-yi's biological mother

Episodes
Directed by Yoo Je-won, Crash Course in Romance consists of 16 episodes. Each title of episode refer to mathematic problems.

Production
The series marked the third collaboration between director Yoo Je-won and screenwriter Yang Hee-seung after High School King of Savvy (2014) and Oh My Ghost (2015). It was reported that filming began in the summer of 2022, and ended on February 5, 2023.

Media

Original soundtrack

Part 1

Part 2

Part 3

Part 4

Part 5

Part 6

Tie-in publishing
The series' original script was published into two books; each covers eight episodes.

Reception

Viewership

Ranking
During its airing, Crash Course in Romance generated big data buzz. According to Good Data Corporation, it ranked first with a topical share of 23.8% in Top 10 of TV Topicality Ranking in drama division category in four weeks in a row. Jung Kyung-ho ranked first in the performer category for five consecutive weeks, while Jeon Do-yeon, Shin Jae-ha, Roh Yoon-seo, and Lee Chae-min ranked 3rd, 6th, 10th, and 14th respectively.

In the OTT media service drama rankings, Crash Course in Romance secured the top spot for three consecutive weeks. According to the weekly integrated content ranking chart of Kinolights (February 4–10, 2023), a content viewing and analysis service, the series which first aired on January 14, took the lead among dramas. In the first week of March, the drama rank second, still took lead among dramas.

Cultural impact 
The series influenced Korean fashion. Gmarket and SSG.com announced on March 13, 2023 that the flower patterned blouse of Nam Haeng-seon (played by Jeon Do-yeon) in the drama are gaining popularity. It was named as "Southbound fashion". According to Gmarket sales data, the sales growth rate of retro fashion such as lace/ruffle blouses (67%), chiffon blouses (62%), and printed blouses (92%) was high during the airing of the drama. Pattern/print blouses (20%), jeans (15%), and lace/ruffle blouses (10%) also sold well on SSG.com.

Notes

References

External links
  
 
 
 
 

Korean-language television shows
TVN (South Korean TV channel) television dramas
Television series by Studio Dragon
South Korean romantic comedy television series
2023 South Korean television series debuts
2023 South Korean television series endings
Korean-language Netflix exclusive international distribution programming